The gens Quirinia was an obscure plebeian family at ancient Rome.  No members of this gens appear in history, but several are known from inscriptions.

Origin
The nomen Quirinius belongs to a class of gentilicia derived from other names ending in -inus.  Its root, the surname Quirinus, was an old Sabine word, apparently derived from quiris, a spear or javelin.  As a cognomen, it was applied to Romulus, the legendary founder and first King of Rome, and it was later applied to other persons, including a family of the Sulpicia gens, and deities, including Mars, Janus, and the deified Augustus.

Members

 Lucius Quirinius Amerimnus, dedicated a tomb at Rome to Sentia Cleopatra, her husband, Appuleius Protus, and their son, Sentius Protus, dated to the late first or early second century AD.
 Quirinia M. l. Ge, a freedwoman, buried along the Via Latina in Rome, together with Marcus Quirinius Pamphilus, in a tomb dating to the first century BC.
 Marcus Quirinius Hermes, client of Sextus Vestilius Lycysus and Quirinia Januaria, to whom he dedicated a tomb at Salernum in Campania.
 Quirinius Hilarus, named in an inscription from Rome.
 Quirinia Januaria, buried at Salernum, aged forty-five, together with Sextus Vestilius Lycysus, in a tomb dedicated by their client, Marcus Quirinius Hermes.
 Marcus Quirinius Pamphilus, buried along the Via Latina, together with Quirinia Ge, in a tomb dating to the first century BC.
 Gaius Quirinius C. f. Proculus, named in an inscription from Aveia in Samnium.
 Lucius Quirinius Tuscus, named in an inscription from Rome.

See also
 List of Roman gentes

References

Bibliography
 Dionysius of Halicarnassus, Romaike Archaiologia (Roman Antiquities).
 Dictionary of Greek and Roman Biography and Mythology, William Smith, ed., Little, Brown and Company, Boston (1849).
 Theodor Mommsen et alii, Corpus Inscriptionum Latinarum (The Body of Latin Inscriptions, abbreviated CIL), Berlin-Brandenburgische Akademie der Wissenschaften (1853–present).
 George Davis Chase, "The Origin of Roman Praenomina", in Harvard Studies in Classical Philology, vol. VIII (1897).
 Massimo Pedrazzoli, Iscrizioni e Vestigia della Via Latina (Inscriptions and Remains of the Via Latina), Rome (1970).

Roman gentes